The Electric Railway Museum (formerly the Coventry Railway Centre) was located in Warwickshire, south-east of Coventry, near the village of Baginton. The heritage railway centre was immediately adjacent to Coventry Airport and so it was also known as "The Airfield Line". The site was managed by the Electric Railway Museum Limited, and was home to a sizeable collection of preserved electric multiple units (EMUs), which was the most diverse and historically significant collection of EMUs in the UK, containing unique items that are the last survivors of once typical and numerous classes. In addition, there were small industrial electric locomotives, two small industrial diesel locomotives, and one small industrial petrol locomotive, along with some other railway vehicles, which are owned by third parties. The land was leased from Coventry City Council, though it is located just outside the city boundary and is in the county of Warwickshire.

On 9 July 2017, it was announced that, owing to the site being sold for development, the museum would close on 8 October 2017 (the last open day of the year). The site was cleared by the end of July 2018 and all railway items and heritage buildings found new homes.

History

Coventry Steam Railway Centre
The site was originally established as the Coventry Steam Railway Centre in 1986 by a group who set out to preserve Hudswell Clarke 0-6-0 tank locomotive number 1857. The group established the site and located the locomotive and other collected items of motive power, rolling stock and infrastructure, including Little Bowden Junction Midland Railway Signal Box there. The land was previously used as part of the municipal water treatment works and there had never been any railway infrastructure there until the creation of the Centre.

Suburban Electric Railway Association
With a small membership, progress was slow and by the mid-1990s had slowed nearly to a halt. The late nineties saw one of the original founders retire due to ill health and he sold his interest in the site to a consortium of Suburban Electric Railway Association (SERA) members, except the tank engine which was sold to another railway. By 2004, the other founders had left and SERA took over sole running of the site.

Electric Railway Museum
In 2009, the responsibility of managing the site passed to Electric Railway Museum Limited, a charitable company which had been established in 2008 to create a permanent home for preserving and representing Britain's electric railway heritage. With this development, the original Coventry Railway Centre Limited company was wound up and its assets passed to Electric Railway Museum Limited. The site was open to the public, and group and individual visits could be admitted by prior booking. The first Chairman was Graeme Gleaves and the museum held its first public open day in September 2010. In 2011 the ERM won the Heritage Railway Association Best Small Group award.

Track layout
The track layout comprised two three road fans of sidings. Those at the end of the site adjacent to the Midlands Air Museum were complete with a headshunt that ran through a 40-metre cutting that was excavated by the members of the original steam centre in the early nineties. The sidings nearest Rowley Road were unconnected. The sidings were protected by an inner fence to create a secure compound.

Facilities
Other improvements made to the site by Electric Railway Museum in late 2009 included the provision of mains electricity on site and state-of-the-art CCTV equipment.

Stock
The vast majority of items not being actively restored were sheeted over to protect them from rusting, vandalism, and other damage.

Electric Multiple Units
Overhead EMUs
BR Class 307 Vehicle 75023 (DT) Br blue. Built in 1955.  (To Colne Valley Railway.)
BR Class 308 Vehicle 75881 (DTCoL)  (To Colne Valley Railway.)
BR Class 309 Units 960 101 & 960 102 (to the Lavender Line and Tanat Valley Light Railway
BR Class 312 Vehicles 78037 (DTCoL) and 71205 (TSO)  (To Colne Valley Railway.)
BR Class 370 Vehicle 49006 (NDM) (To Crewe Heritage Centre)

Third rail Southern Region
BR Class 405 4Sub unit 4732 Vehicle nos: 12795-12354-10239-12796 (To Locomotive Storage Ltd.)
BR Class 414 2Hap unit 4311 Vehicle nos: 61287-75407 (To Peak Rail.)
BR Class 416 2EPB units 932053 and 6307 (To Battlefield Line Railway and Hope Farm, Sellindge, Kent.)
BR Class 457 unit 7001 vehicle 67300 (To East Kent Railway.)

Third rail Midland Region.
BR Class 501 2 car unit formed DMBS vehicle 61183 + DTBS vehicle 75186 (To MoD Bicester.)
BR Class 503 unit 28690+29720+29289 (To Locomotive Storage Ltd.)

Others
Liverpool Overhead Railway Rebuilt First Class Trailer Car No. 7 (To Hope Farm, Sellindge.)

Locomotives
Diesel Locomotives
Ruston & Hornsby 0-4-0 Diesel Electric 165DE b. 1950 Wks. No. 268881 "Mazda" (Operational) (To Battlefield Line Railway.)
Ruston & Hornsby 4wd Diesel Mechanical 88DS b. 1953 Wks. No. 338416 "Crabtree" (Undergoing restoration) (To Tanat Valley Light Railway.)

Electric Locomotives
Spondon Power Station No. 1 = 4wd battery/Overhead Electric Loco b. 1935 English Electric Wks. No. E905 (Operational) (To Battlefield Line Railway.)
Kearsley Power Station No. 1 = Bo-Bo Overhead 550vDC Electric Loco b. 1928 Hawthorn Leslie Wks No. 3682 (Awaiting restoration) (To East Kent Railway.)
Heysham Power Station No. 1 = Bo-Bo Battery Electric Loco b. 1945 Robert Stephenson and Hawthorns Wks No. 7284 "Doug Tottman" (Operational)  (To Colne Valley Railway.)

Carriages
No. 135 City & South London Railway Wood Body Carriage (To Hope Farm, Sellindge.)
No. 163 City & South London Railway Steel Body Carriage (to Neasden Depot.)
No. 60750 / RDB 975386 experimental tilting coach 'Hastings' (To Battlefield Line Railway.)

Gallery

Closure
On 9 July 2017, it was announced that, owing to the site being sold for development, the museum would close on 8 October 2017 (the last open day of the year). The future of the museum and its collection of unique electric multiple units and other items was uncertain at that time, with efforts to raise £10,000 underway to cover the costs of moving the stock to an as yet unknown location. Ruston & Hornsby 88 diesel shunter, nicknamed "Crabtree", and BR Class 309 unit 960 101 were moved to the Tanat Valley Light Railway in May 2018 with the EMU to serve as a static museum and buffet train at Nantmawr.

References

External links

 Electric Railway Museum Limited - Site Managers as well as owners of the Class 309 units, SR 2-EPB Unit, Class 307, Class 308 and custodians of Spondon No.1 Locomotive.

Heritage railways in Warwickshire
Railway museums in England
Electric railways